The 100th Independent Brigade of the Territorial Defense Forces is a military formation of the Territorial Defense Forces of Ukraine in Volyn Oblast. It is part of Operational Command West.

History

Formation 
During 8 October 2018 Oleksandr Savchenko Governor of Volyn Oblast announced that Brigade needed 6,000 soldiers. On 17 December 2018 the brigade was formed Volyn Oblast. The brigade was planned to be composed of older reservists, aged 41-60 year old.

Russo-Ukrainian War

2022 Russian invasion of Ukraine
In July Brigade was building fortifications near north border with Belarus.
Brigade held various exercises to improve efficiency of its artillery and anti-aircraft units. In December there was a joint exercise involving National Guard of Ukraine and National Police of Ukraine.

Structure 
As of 2022 the brigade's structure is as follows:
 Headquarters
 50th Territorial Defense Battalion (Ratne) А7059
 51st Territorial Defense Battalion (Kamin-Kashyrskyi) А7060
 52nd Territorial Defense Battalion (Manevychi) А7061
 53rd Territorial Defense Battalion (Lutsk) А7062
 54th Territorial Defense Battalion (Kovel) А7063
 55th Territorial Defense Battalion (Volodymyr) А7064
 Counter-Sabotage Company
 Engineering Company
 Communication Company
 Logistics Company
 Mortar Battery

Commanders 
 Colonel Kucher Oleksandr 2018 - 2020
 Colonel Tkachuk Ruslan 2022 - present

See also 
 Territorial Defense Forces of the Armed Forces of Ukraine

References 

Territorial defense Brigades of Ukraine
2018 establishments in Ukraine
Military units and formations established in 2018